The Spokane Public Library and Spokane County Library District system provide the Spokane area with access to information and study space. Secondary education is provided by Spokane Public Schools with its six high schools, six middle schools, and thirty-four elementary schools. Public charter, private, and parochial schools offer more choices of study. Higher education in Spokane is served by the Community Colleges of Spokane system (Spokane Community College and Spokane Falls Community College) and two private universities, Gonzaga University and Whitworth University as well as various trade and technical schools. The University District in Downtown Spokane is also host to branch locations of regional universities such as Washington State University Spokane and its medical school, the Elson S. Floyd College of Medicine.

According to the U.S. Census Bureau, the total school enrollment in Spokane was 54,830 in 2011. Nursery school and kindergarten enrollment was 5,484 and elementary or high school enrollment was 30,548 children. College or graduate school enrollment was 18,798. As of 2011, 91.6 percent of people 25 years and over had at least graduated from high school and 29.2 percent had a bachelor's degree or higher.

Libraries

Serving the general educational needs of the local population are two public library districts, the Spokane Public Library (within city limits) and the Spokane County Library District. Founded in 1904 with funding from philanthropist Andrew Carnegie, the Spokane Public Library system comprises a downtown library overlooking the Spokane Falls and five branch libraries. Special collections focus on Inland Pacific Northwest history and include reference books, periodicals, maps, photographs, and other archival materials and government documents. The downtown Spokane Public Library branch located at 906 West Main has a collection size of 435,902 volumes and an annual circulation of 2,060,220 items per year. The first downtown library building, The Carnegie Building, still stands 5 blocks from the current Downtown library and bears his namesake.

The libraries for the colleges and universities in Spokane include the Spokane Community College Library, Spokane Falls Community College Library, Gonzaga's Foley Center Library which has a collection size of 427,262 volumes and annual circulation of 48,889 items per year as well as their School of Law's Chastek Library and Whitworth's Harriet Cheney Cowles Memorial Library which has a collection size of 220,568 and an annual circulation of 19,672.

Elementary and secondary education

Public school system

Spokane Public Schools (District No. 81) was organized in 1889, and is the largest public school system in Spokane, and the second-largest in the state, as of 2014, serving roughly 30,000 students in six high schools, six middle schools, and thirty-four elementary schools. Within Spokane Public Schools, there are two Washington State Charter School commission approved independent charter schools to provide alternative choices to traditional high schools, these are Innovation High School in the independent PRIDE Schools district and the Spokane International Academy.

In north Spokane, there is the Mead School District No. 354 which has two traditional high schools, Mead High School and Mt. Spokane High School. Other major public school districts in the Spokane area include the Central Valley School District (which contains Central Valley High School, University High School, and Ridgeline High School), West Valley School District (West Valley High School), and East Valley School District (East Valley High School) in Spokane Valley. Smaller districts in the surrounding area include the Cheney School District (Cheney High School), Deer Park School District (Deer Park High School), Freeman School District (Freeman High School), Liberty School District (Liberty High School), Medical Lake School District (Medical Lake High School), Nine Mile Falls School District (Lakeside High School), Orchard Prairie School District, and Riverside School District (Riverside High School).

Spokane area public high schools 

Note: 
This is not an exhaustive list. This is a selective list that is intended to focus on public high schools in school districts that have a presence in the city of Spokane and may include other major districts or high schools in the Spokane metropolitan area (Spokane County).
Enrollment figures as of April 2021.

Private education

A variety of private and parochial elementary and secondary schools augment the public school system. Among the parochial schools, the Roman Catholic Diocese of Spokane manages ten such schools in and around the area, among them being Gonzaga Preparatory School. Other parochial schools in the Spokane metro area include the Upper Columbia Academy to the south in Spangle, a boarding high school offering a Seventh-day Adventist education and the Northwest Christian School to the north in Colbert, a non-denominational Kindergarten-12th grade school. The Saint George's School in north Spokane is one of the only K-12 independent secular private preparatory schools in Spokane and offers an International Baccalaureate program of study.

There are schools that exist to meet special needs and those that offer specialist education, such as Montessori schools, or an emphasis on a particular part of the curriculum. Private schools are subject to a state approval process. Examples include the Lilac Blind Foundation, Spokane Guild's School and Neuromuscular Center, and the Spokane Art School.

The Salish School of Spokane is a language preservation school that serves the Native American community of various tribal backgrounds and ancestry with language and cultural immersion experiences to increase intergenerational transmission of the endangered Salish language family in addition to traditional mentoring and academic support. The school offers a K-6 grade curriculum and plans to offer a secondary education.

Spokane area private secondary schools

Note: 
This is not an exhaustive list. This is a selective list that intends to include private schools that provide instruction in part or fully for the high school grade levels 9-12 that are in the Spokane metropolitan area (Spokane County).
Enrollment figures as of April 2021.

Colleges and universities

Higher education institutions in Spokane include the private universities Gonzaga and Whitworth, and the public Community Colleges of Spokane system (Spokane Community College and Spokane Falls Community College) as well as a variety of local branch campuses and technical institutes.

The Community Colleges of Spokane operate Spokane Community College (SCC), Spokane Falls Community College (SFCC), and the Institute for Extended Learning, which coordinates rural outreach, business and community training, adult literacy services, and Spokane County Head Start/ECEAP/Early Head Start. Spokane Community College began operations on September 16, 1963, on the site of the Spokane Technical and Vocational School (established in 1953) at Mission and Greene. During a period of growth, Spokane Community College built a second campus on Fort George Wright Drive (now Spokane Falls Community College), which the Board of Trustees decided to separate in 1970, creating two distinct entities. Both SCC and SFCC offer four-year bachelor of applied science degrees, SFCC in applied management and cybersecurity and SCC in respiratory therapy. As of 2020, the Community Colleges of Spokane serves approximately 20,000 students a year and offers over 120 degree programs.

Gonzaga University and Law School were founded by the Italian-born priest Joseph Cataldo and the Jesuits in 1887. Gonzaga offers 43 undergraduate degree programs, 26 master's degree programs, a doctoral program in educational leadership, and a Juris Doctor (law degree).  Gonzaga is one of three schools that offer a law degree in the state of Washington. The school has a total enrollment of about 7,700.

Whitworth was founded in Tacoma, Washington in 1890 and moved to its present location in 1914 following a generous land donation by railroad magnate Jay P. Graves and $100,000 in support from the community. The move alleviated persistent financial difficulties owing to competition with the College of Puget Sound and Pacific Lutheran Academy which were also located in Tacoma. It is affiliated with the Presbyterian Church and had 2,500 students studying in 53 different undergraduate and degree programs as of 2011.

A variety of regional universities located elsewhere in the Inland Northwest have operations in Spokane's University District. The University District is the site of Washington State University Spokane (formerly the Riverpoint Campus); WSU Spokane is WSU's health sciences campus and houses the school's College of Nursing, College of Pharmacy, and Elson S. Floyd College of Medicine.

The University District serves as WSU Spokane's center for advanced graduate and professional studies and research in the health sciences and health professions. WSU Spokane programs focus on the health sciences, educational administration, and criminal justice. Among its research centers is the WSU Sleep and Performance Research Center, that does controlled laboratory studies of sleep, wake, and work and the consequences of fatigue. A consortium of organizations and WSU operate the Spokane Teaching Health Center, a clinic where the medical residents and WSU students work in collaborative teams to serve low-income community members in need. The campus also has a Veterinary Specialty Teaching Clinic.

The University of Washington's Schools of Medicine and Dentistry had first-year and second-year medical students and first-year dental students at the Riverpoint Campus in partnership with both WSU and EWU as part of their WWAMI (medical) and RIDE (dental) programs, however the WWAMI relationship with WSU ended after WSU College of Medicine was created following the repeal of a law that disallowed a second public medical school in the state. The University of Washington has continued its medical education in Spokane by developing a relationship with Gonzaga. The University District is also home to Innovate Washington (formerly Sirti), a Washington state economic development agency that accelerates the development and growth of innovative technology companies.

Other schools in Spokane include the Inland Northwest Culinary Academy, Spokane Art School, and Great Northern University. The Inland Northwest Culinary Academy at Spokane Community College is an American Culinary Federation accredited program for training professional chefs. Great Northern University is a Christian school established in 2018 on the site of a vacated Moody Bible Institute branch campus which offers seven bachelor's degree programs which include: biblical and theological studies, communication, leadership studies, youth and family ministry, intercultural studies, linguistics and TESOL (Teaching English to Speakers of Other Languages).

Spokane area colleges and universities

Note: Enrollment figures include full-time and part-time undergraduate students and graduate students; the Niche website shows undergraduate and graduate enrollment numbers on different tabs on the institution's profile. Enrollment figures as of April 2021.

Defunct institutions
Defunct institutions that were located in or near Spokane include Spokane University, Spokane College, Spokane Junior College, and a campus of the University of Phoenix and ITT Tech, the People to People Student Ambassador Program, and MEAD Alternative High School.

See also

References

External links 
National Center for Education Statistics: Spokane School District
Niche profile: Spokane School District
Spokane County Private Schools